Mészöly is a Hungarian surname. Notable people with the surname include:

Géza Mészöly (footballer) (born 1967), Hungarian international football (soccer) player, son of Kálmán Mészöly
Géza Mészöly (painter) (1844–1887), Hungarian Romantic painter
Kálmán Mészöly (born 1941), Hungarian football (soccer) player and coach, father of Géza Mészöly

Hungarian-language surnames